Little Caesar may refer to:

People
 Ptolemy XV Philopator Philometor Caesar, nicknamed Caesarion ("Little Caesar"), last pharaoh of Egypt, son of Julius Caesar and Cleopatra 
 Little Caesar (singer) (1928-1994; birth name Harry Caesar) U.S. singer
 Abe Saperstein (1902–1966), nicknamed "Little Caesar", founder of the Harlem Globetrotters
 Lil' Cease, the stage name for rap artist James Lloyd, also known as "Lil' Cesar"

Music

Bands
 Little Caesar (band), American hard rock band
 Little Caesar and the Consuls, Canadian rock band
 Little Caesar & the Romans, American vocal group

Songs
 "Little Caesar" (Kiss song), from the 1989 Kiss album, Hot in the Shade
 "Little Caesar," a song by Blondie from the  1982 album, The Hunter

Entertainment
 Little Caesar, a 1929 novel by William R. Burnett
 Little Caesar (film), a 1931 film based on the Burnett novel
 Little Caesar, a character in The Twilight Zone episode "Caesar and Me"

Other uses
 Little Caesars, a pizza chain formed in 1959
 Little Caesars Arena, Detroit, Michigan, USA; a multipurpose arena for ice hockey and basketball
 Little Caesars Pizza Bowl (1997-2013) college football game

See also

 
 Caesar (disambiguation)
 Little (disambiguation)